Mohamed Amsif (born 7 February 1989) is a professional footballer who plays as a goalkeeper for German  club SV Wehen Wiesbaden. Born in Germany, he represented Morocco at the 2012 Summer Olympics, playing in all three of their games.

He attended the Gesamtschule Berger Feld.

References

External links
 Mohamed Amsif at fcaugsburg.de 
 

1989 births
Living people
Riffian people
People educated at the Gesamtschule Berger Feld
German people of Moroccan descent
Moroccan footballers
German footballers
Footballers from Düsseldorf
Association football goalkeepers
Morocco international footballers
Morocco A' international footballers
Germany youth international footballers
Bundesliga players
2. Bundesliga players
Wuppertaler SV players
FC Schalke 04 II players
FC Schalke 04 players
FC Augsburg players
1. FC Union Berlin players
Ittihad Tanger players
Fath Union Sport players
SV Wehen Wiesbaden players
2012 Africa Cup of Nations players
Olympic footballers of Morocco
Footballers at the 2012 Summer Olympics
2020 African Nations Championship players